Radio Zindagi (Hindi: जिंदगी, pronounced "Jindagī", meaning "life") is a franchised radio format that is currently broadcasting in California, New York, and the Washington DC metro area.  It is currently the largest South Asian radio format in North America and had its beginnings with KZDG in California starting in 2011.

The current affiliates now include:
 KZDG AM 1550 in San Francisco, California
 KSJO-HD2 92.3 FM in San Jose, California
 WHUD-HD2 100.7 FM in Peekskill, New York
 WSPK-HD2 104.7 FM in Poughkeepsie, New York
 WSSR-HD2 96.7 FM in the Chicago area

References

Franchised radio formats
Hindi-language mass media in the United States
South Asian American culture